Lau Kwok Kin (born 17 January 1977) is a fencer from Hong Kong, China who won a bronze medal at the 2006 Asian Games and 2010 Asian Games in the men's foil team competition. As the one and only 2-time Olympian from Hong Kong, he was the first one to officially qualified(NB) to competed at the 2004 and 2008 Olympic Games
The first Hong Kong Male Athlete to receive bronze medal from National Fencing Championship in China. The first Hong Kong male athlete to enter into TOP 16 in the World Fencing Championship.
Lau Kwok Kin has been the ranking #1 athlete in Hong Kong for more than 10 years. He was also the committee member of HK Fencing Association for 10 years.

He was also invited as honorary coach for the HK Fencing community outreach where he volunteer coaching for community service

NB: before 1996, there is no requirement to compete for "Qualification" for participating in Olympic game. Any country can send representative to participate in Olympic game. But after 1996, as there is increasing number of participating countries, so the committee has decided to implement the "qualification" policy where the athlete must compete within the zone to get the qualification.

References

Living people
1977 births
Hong Kong male foil fencers
Fencers at the 2004 Summer Olympics
Fencers at the 2008 Summer Olympics
Olympic fencers of Hong Kong
Place of birth missing (living people)
Asian Games medalists in fencing
Fencers at the 1998 Asian Games
Fencers at the 2002 Asian Games
Fencers at the 2006 Asian Games
Fencers at the 2010 Asian Games
Asian Games bronze medalists for Hong Kong
Medalists at the 2006 Asian Games
Medalists at the 2010 Asian Games